This is a list of VTV dramas released in 2012.

←2011 - 2012 - 2013→

VTV Special Tet dramas
These are short dramas airs on VTV1 during Tet Holiday.

VTV1 Weeknight Prime-time dramas

Monday-Wednesday dramas
These dramas air from 20:05 to 20:50, Monday to Wednesday on VTV1.

Thursday-Friday dramas
These dramas air from 20:05 to 20:50, Thursday and Friday on VTV1.

VTV3 Weeknight Prime-time dramas

Monday-Wednesday dramas
These dramas air from 21:30 to 22:20, Monday to Wednesday on VTV3.

Thursday-Friday dramas
These dramas air from 21:30 to 22:20, Thursday and Friday on VTV3.

VTV3 Rubic 8 dramas
These dramas air from 14:30 to 15:15 (15:00 to 15:50 since Duyên nghiệp), Saturday and Sunday on VTV3 as a part of the program Rubic 8.

VTV6 Lemon Tea dramas
New time slot called Lemon Tea (Vietnamese: Trà chanh) was opened this year towards young audiences.

These dramas air from 19:15 to 20:00, Saturday and Sunday on VTV6.

See also
 List of dramas broadcast by Vietnam Television (VTV)
 List of dramas broadcast by Hanoi Radio Television (HanoiTV)
 List of dramas broadcast by Vietnam Digital Television (VTC)

References

External links
VTV.gov.vn – Official VTV Website 
VTV.vn – Official VTV Online Newspaper 

Vietnam Television original programming
2012 in Vietnamese television